

























References

Lists of country codes